Bringing Down A Dictator is a 56-minute documentary film by Steve York about the nonviolent defeat of Serbian leader Slobodan Milosevic.  It focuses on the contributions of the student-led Otpor! movement.  The film originally aired on national PBS in March 2002.  It was narrated by Martin Sheen and won the George Foster Peabody Award.

Other awards include:

ABCNews VideoSource Award --- The International Documentary Association
Silver Chris Award --- Columbus International Film and Video Festival
Bronze Plaque: Scriptwriting --- Columbus International Film and Video Festival
Silver Plaque --- The Chicago International Television Festival
Gold Remi --- Worldfest Houston International Film Festival
Best Documentary --- Sedona International Film Festival

Bringing Down A Dictator was broadcast several times in the former Republic of Georgia in the fall of 2003 and was credited with helping the citizens there organize their nonviolent protest against the electoral fraud linked to Eduard Shevardnadze, in what was called the Rose Revolution. In a February 9, 2011 news piece on the Al-Jazeera-English channel, members of the youth leaders of the Egyptian Revolution of 2011 are seen watching Bringing Down A Dictator during an organizational meeting.

Screenings
 2010 Zagreb International Film Festival
2010 Swarthmore College Peace Week
2008 Cairo Human Rights Film Festival
2007 Harvard University Program on Negotiation
2007 7islands Film Festival, India
2002 UCLA International Institute
2002 The Woodrow Wilson International Center for Scholars
2002 G6 Summit, Calgary, Canada

References

External links
A Force More Powerful Productions website
York Zimmerman Inc. website
Centre for Applied Nonviolent Action and Strategies Serbian Case

Documentary films about elections
2002 television films
2002 films
American documentary films
Films about dictators
Films set in Serbia
Documentary films about revolutions
Overthrow of Slobodan Milošević
Peabody Award-winning broadcasts
Films directed by Steve York
2002 documentary films
Cultural depictions of Slobodan Milošević
Documentary films about Serbia
2000s Serbian-language films
2000s American films